Jacob Peterson (born 19 July 1999) is a Swedish professional ice hockey player for the San Jose Barracuda of the American Hockey League (AHL) as a prospect for the San Jose Sharks of the National Hockey League (NHL). Peterson was drafted in the fifth round, 132nd overall, by the Stars in the 2017 NHL Entry Draft.

Playing career
Peterson made his SHL debut playing for Frölunda HC in 2017, playing in nine games in the 2017–18 season.

In his fourth year with Frölunda HC in 2019–20, Peterson played his first full season in the SHL, recording career bests with five goals and 16 points through 43 games before the season was cancelled due to COVID-19. On 1 April 2020, Peterson opted to leave Frölunda HC, agreeing to a two-year contract with fellow SHL club, Färjestad BK.

On 28 April 2021, Peterson was signed by draft club, the Dallas Stars, to a two-year, entry-level contract.

During the  season at the NHL trade deadline, on 3 March 2023, the Stars traded Peterson to the San Jose Sharks in exchange for Scott Reedy.

Career statistics

Regular season and playoffs

International

Awards and honours

References

External links
 

1999 births
Living people
IF Björklöven players
Dallas Stars draft picks
Dallas Stars players
Färjestad BK players
Frölunda HC players
People from Lidköping Municipality
San Jose Barracuda players
Sportspeople from Västra Götaland County
Swedish ice hockey forwards
Texas Stars players